Embedded application may refer to:

 Embedded system
 Embedded operating system